The 2015 1. divisjon (referred to as the OBOS-ligaen for sponsorship reasons) was a Norwegian second-tier football league season. The league was contested by 16 teams, and the top two teams were promoted to Tippeligaen, while the teams placed from third to sixth place played a promotion-playoff against the 14th-placed team in Tippeligaen to win promotion. The bottom four teams were relegated to the 2. divisjon.

The first round of the season was played on 6 April 2015 and the season ended with the last round on 1 November 2015. The playoff-tournament was played between 7 and 21 November 2015.

An agreement with Oslo's housing cooperative OBOS was signed on 15 January 2015, branding the league as OBOS-ligaen until 2021.

Team changes from 2014
In the 2014 1. divisjon, Sandefjord, Tromsø and Mjøndalen won promotion to Tippeligaen, while Alta, HamKam, Tromsdalen and Ull/Kisa were relegated to the 2015 2. divisjon.

Sogndal, Sandnes Ulf and Brann, were relegated from the 2014 Tippeligaen, while Follo, Jerv, Levanger and Åsane were promoted from the 2014 2. divisjon.

Teams

Managerial changes

League table

Results

Season statistics

Top scorers

Source:

Most assists

Hat tricks

References

Norwegian First Division seasons
2
Norway
Norway